Gillmeria scutata is a moth of the family Pterophoridae that is known from the Honshu province of Japan.

External links
Taxonomic And Biological Studies Of Pterophoridae Of Japan (Lepidoptera)
Japanese Moths

Moths described in 1961
Platyptiliini
Endemic fauna of Japan
Moths of Japan